Spirama remota is a species of moth of the family Erebidae. It is found in Indonesia (Ambon Island, Seram) and New Guinea.

References

Moths described in 1861
Spirama